Shinganahalli is a village in Dharwad district of Karnataka, India.

Demographics 
As of the 2011 Census of India there were 744 households in Shinganahalli and a total population of 3,284 consisting of 1,654 males and 1,630 females. There were 481 children ages 0-6.

References

Villages in Dharwad district